Lucas Gabriel Ribeiro Firmo (born 29 May 2000), known as Lucão, is a Brazilian footballer who plays as a forward for Farense.

Club career
Born in Patos de Minas, Minas Gerais, Lucão played for the youth categories of hometown sides URT and Mamoré before joining América Mineiro in 2017. He moved to Trindade in the following year, and played for their under-20 side before making his first team debut on 29 September 2018 by coming on as a second-half substitute in a 0–1 Campeonato Goiano Segunda Divisão home loss against CRAC.

Lucão signed for Grêmio Anápolis for the 2019 season, and played in two Campeonato Goiano matches before returning to Trindade to play for their under-20 side. In the middle of the year, he moved abroad and joined Portuguese side S.C. Braga, but only appeared for their under-23 team.

Lucão returned to Grêmio Anápolis in December 2019, but only featured sparingly before being loaned to Goianésia for the 2020 Série D. He returned to his parent club in January 2021, and scored five goals in the 2021 Goiano as his club won their first ever title.

On 26 May 2021, Lucão agreed to a loan deal with Série A side Atlético Goianiense until the end of the year, with a buyout clause. He made his debut in the category four days later, replacing Zé Roberto late into a 1–0 away win against Corinthians.

Career statistics

Honours
Grêmio Anápolis
Campeonato Goiano: 2021

References

External links

2000 births
Living people
Sportspeople from Minas Gerais
Brazilian footballers
Association football forwards
Campeonato Brasileiro Série A players
Campeonato Brasileiro Série D players
Liga Portugal 2 players
Trindade Atlético Clube players
Grêmio Esportivo Anápolis players
Goianésia Esporte Clube players
Atlético Clube Goianiense players
A.D. Sanjoanense players
S.C. Farense players
Brazilian expatriate footballers
Brazilian expatriate sportspeople in Portugal
Expatriate footballers in Portugal